Michael Hafftka is an American figurative expressionist painter living in New York City. His work is represented in the permanent collections of a number of museums, including: The Metropolitan Museum of Art, New York Museum of Modern Art, Brooklyn Museum of Art, San Francisco Museum of Modern Art, Carnegie Museum of Art, New York Public Library, McNay Art Museum, Housatonic Museum of Art, Arizona State University Art Museum, National Gallery of Art, and Yeshiva University Museum.

Hafftka was born in Manhattan (1953) to Eva and Simon Hafftka, European refugees and Holocaust survivors. He was raised in the Bronx and attended public schools.

Hafftka designed covers for Urizen Books, including Detour, Wedding Feast and Circuits, by Michael Brodsky. Kevin Begos of Guignol Books published Hafftka's drawings in 1982.

His first one-person show was at Art Galaxy. Among the New York galleries that subsequently have featured his work are: the Rosa Esman Gallery, the Aberbach Gallery, the Mary Ryan Gallery, and the DiLaurenti Gallery. He has also exhibited widely in the United States and abroad.

The Housatonic Museum of Art mounted a retrospective in October 2004.

Yeshiva University Museum at the Center for Jewish History in New York held a solo exhibition I of the Storm, a major show of recent works, March through August 2009.

Illustrated Books
 Conscious/Unconscious, short stories and drawings by Michael Hafftka, Six Gallery Press 2007, 
 In the Penal Colony, a short story by Franz Kafka illustrated by Michael Hafftka, Limited Editions Club 1987, ASIN B003Y7OW8W
 The Terror of Loch Ness, a novel by Che Elias, illustrated by Michael Hafftka, Six Gallery Press 2007, 
 Circular Stairs, Distress in the Mirrors, poems by Peter Klappert with art by Michael Hafftka, Six Gallery Press 2008,  
 To Die Next To You, poems by Rodger Kamenetz with art by Michael Hafftka, Six Gallery Press, 2013,

Digital Publications
 My Declaration of Independence and how I see it as an artist in a decentralized ecosystem, a blog post by Michael Hafftka, January 24th, 2023
 Hafftka Computer Paintings 1996-98, a blog post by Michael Hafftka, March 1st, 2023

References

Further reading
 Michael Hafftka: Dreamworks By Professor Sam Hunter
 The Adirondack Review
 Do we learn from history? Genocide and “The Selecting Hand” by Michael Hafftka by Claudia Moscovici
 Toward the Plane of the Sacred: Hafftka’s Great Chain of Being By Michael Brodsky

External links
Official website
@hafftka on Twitter
hafftka on Instagram

20th-century American painters
American male painters
21st-century American painters
21st-century American male artists
1953 births
Living people
20th-century American Jews
DeWitt Clinton High School alumni
Jewish painters
20th-century American printmakers
Painters from New York (state)
21st-century American Jews
20th-century American male artists
Neo-expressionist artists